Aurora Aksnes (born 15 June 1996), known mononymously as Aurora (stylized in all caps), is a Norwegian singer, songwriter and record producer. Born in Stavanger and raised in the towns of Høle and Os, she began writing her first songs and learning dance at the age of six. After some of her songs were uploaded online and became popular in Norway, she signed a recording contract with Petroleum Records, Decca and Glassnote Records in 2014. Aurora gained recognition with her debut extended play (EP), Running with the Wolves (2015), which contained the sleeper hit "Runaway". Later that year, she provided the backing track for the John Lewis Christmas advert, singing a cover of the Oasis song "Half the World Away".

Aurora's debut studio album, All My Demons Greeting Me as a Friend (2016) received generally positive reviews, charting in various European countries and earning platinum certification two times in Norway. Her second EP Infections of a Different Kind (Step 1) (2018) was the first part of a two-part album, while the second part was her second studio album, A Different Kind of Human (Step 2) (2019). Her third studio album The Gods We Can Touch was released on 21 January 2022.

Her music is primarily electropop, folk, and art pop with vocals referred to as "ethereal". She only played piano at the beginning of her career, but later involved herself in percussion and other aspects of music production. In addition to her solo work, Aurora has collaborated with and co-written songs for other artists, including Icarus, Askjell, Lena, Travis and the Chemical Brothers. She has also contributed to soundtracks for several films and television series, including Girls, Frozen II and Wolfwalkers.

Early life

Aurora was born on 15 June 1996 in the Stavanger University Hospital in Stavanger, the youngest of three daughters to midwife May Britt (née Froastad) and garage door salesman Jan Øystein Aksnes. Her oldest sister, Miranda, is a makeup artist and former teacher. Her other sister Viktoria is a fashion designer, stylist, and blogger. She spent her first three years in Høle, a small town where her parents had lived for 15 years. In her house in Høle, Aurora developed her taste for nature, singing, and traditional clothing, such as hats and long skirts. Later the family moved further north in western Norway, to a house in the small village of Drange, located in the woodlands of the Os mountains, a remote municipality in Hordaland, near Bergen and Lysefjord (a fjord which translates to fjord of light). Aurora has described this place as: "There are almost no cars, and the roads are small and bumpy, and there are lots of trees everywhere; it's very quiet, and the internet is bad." She has also compared it to the fictional land of Narnia.

She calls herself a "forest person" due to being surrounded by nature and her love to "climb trees", and being "isolated and hidden". She has also shown interest in the ocean since she lived close to the sea, and her parents have a sailboat. When she attended school, her sisters—Miranda (currently her makeup artist) and Viktoria Aksnes (currently her costume designer)—worried that she might be bullied due to her eccentric personality and style of dress. Contrary to this, Aurora's classmates asked for more time than she was willing to give, and she instead preferred to spend time in the forest. She also claimed that withdrawing into natural spaces gave her time to philosophize and discover the "power" of her own mind. As a child, she was afraid of people who sought to hug her and disliked such a gesture in general: "I used to be terrified of people who wanted to hug me", she said. "I did not like to be hugged as a child. And I used to be terrified of one of my teachers at school, but then I met him a few months ago, and it was really nice. It’s weird how things change."

One of her earliest musical memories is finding an electric piano in her parents' attic that once belonged to her sister Miranda, and being fascinated by the melodies it could produce on that instrument, or sing along to the song "Don't Worry, Be Happy" around the family table. Even though her parents sang that song in a choir as a hobby, Aurora is the only member in her family to pursue a musical career. She started learning to play piano when she was six by playing the songs she listened to: "I really love classic music, and when I found this piano in the attic, I just started pressing the keys and trying to figure out my favorite classical songs. I started to make melodies that I recognized. There was something special about being able to play just by yourself – something about the emotion in it made me want to continue playing." At age nine, when she had a better handle of the English language, she began writing songs. She has mentioned being influenced at that time by artists like Leonard Cohen, Bob Dylan, Enya, and the Chemical Brothers.

Her parents had never encouraged her to pursue this activity as a career or hobby, but as she got older, she went from imitating classical music to composing her own material, never thinking of doing it to entertain people, and preferring to keep her music private. Instead, besides a songwriter she aspired to become a doctor, a physicist or a dancer, and she took dance classes from 6 to 16 years old and performed in a contemporary dance group. The group participated at the Norwegian Youth Festival of Art twice, dancing with the songs "Decode" by Paramore and "Feeling Good" in the background. They also danced to Michael Jackson's "Ghosts" at an event in 2011. She also expressed that her dislike of her own voice was a reason not to think of being a singer.

According to Aurora, the first song she ever finished writing was titled "The Lonely Man". Her first work before embarking on her music career was washing a pizza restaurant using a hose. Songs from her early works were written in this early stage of her life. Another of her early compositions was "I Had a Dream", which referred to how hard the world can be. Although she considered it a "really long and boring song about world peace" she performed it once at her high school's leaving ceremony. The recording of her song "Puppet" (which was originally made as a Christmas gift for her parents) and a video filmed by a classmate of her school performance were uploaded online without her permission (which made her angry), and was quickly discovered by a representative of the agency of Artists Made Management, a Norwegian management company, who invited Aurora to visit their office for a meeting in early 2013. Aurora initially denied the proposal: "At first I thought no", she recalls, "but then my mum said I should think about the idea of sharing my music with the world because maybe there's someone out there who desperately needs it. And that could actually be a good thing". In a few hours, both songs received thousands of visits in Norway, which earned Aurora some recognition in her country, in addition to a fan base on Facebook.

Career

2012–2016: Running with the Wolves and All My Demons Greeting Me as a Friend

Aurora self-released the song "Puppet" as her debut single in December 2012 under her birth name. Aurora then set about working on her songwriting for around a year before giving her "first proper live performance" at Nabovarsel Minifestival in Bergen. About similar performances to that one she said: "I don’t think I was born to be an entertainer, I used to really be afraid of playing live on-stage. Obviously it’s terrifying! But now I’ve learned to, and I’ve learned to not focus on myself, cause it’s not about me. Now I only think about giving everyone the best experience. A magic moment." Her second single, "Awakening", followed in March 2014, which became the first one released under the stage name Aurora. Her third single "Under Stars" was the first one signed to her labels Glassnote Records and Decca Records, released in November 2014. Both songs established her as a "Promising Artist" of 2015 and attracted the attention of critics in Europe and the United States, especially for the artist's voice. Her next single "Runaway" was released in February 2015, which gained attention from singers Katy Perry and Troye Sivan.

Her next single, "Running with the Wolves" was released in April 2015, and its music video was released two months later. The song gained attention from BBC Radio station. It was released alongside the announcement of the release of her debut EP Running with the Wolves. Released in May 2015 on digital platforms, the EP received positive reviews from online music blogs and national press. To promote the EP, she appeared at summer festivals such as Way Out West, Wilderness, and Green Man Festival. Aurora's next single, "Murder Song (5, 4, 3, 2, 1)", was released in September 2015 and has received continued support in the national press, on national radio, and popular online music blogs. Aurora also performed at the 2015 Nobel Peace Prize Concert, saying that she and her family "have been following it from the living room at home for many years", and "it is an incredibly beautiful thing to be a part of." Her presentation was praised by the concert's host Jay Leno. She has played a sold-out headline show in London and supported Of Monsters and Men at Brixton Academy in November 2015. Aurora recorded a cover of the Oasis song "Half the World Away" for the 2015 John Lewis Christmas advert. Her next single, titled "Conqueror", was released in January 2016, and a music video was released the following month. Before the single release, the song appeared in the soundtrack of the videogame FIFA 16.

In early 2016, Aurora featured on British band Icarus' song "Home" and released a cover of David Bowie's "Life on Mars" for the HBO Girls television series. After a prolific start with her first musical productions, she released her debut album All My Demons Greeting Me as a Friend in March 2016, receiving generally positive reviews from critics. After releasing the album, Aurora embarked on an international concert tour beginning in Australia that lasted more than a year.

On 14 March 2016, Aurora made her American television debut on The Tonight Show Starring Jimmy Fallon, performing "Conqueror", which was later performed on Conan. On 25 July 2016 she performed her cover of "Life on Mars" on The Howard Stern Show. The following night on 26 July, she performed "I Went Too Far" on The Late Show with Stephen Colbert, which was later released as the album's fifth single. The album's sixth and final single "Winter Bird" was released on 20 December. Aurora became the first in a series of emerging artists to partner with YouTube for a creative content distribution program, she also starred in her own short documentary directed by Isaac Ravishankara and produced by The Fader, titled "Nothing is Eternal."

2017–2019: Infections of a Different Kind and A Different Kind of Human

When All My Demons Greeting Me as a Friend debuted, Aurora said that it was "the first album of many" she was planning to release. As of 12 May 2016, after coming back from her European tour, the singer announced that she was ready to begin writing and producing more material, which will form her second studio album. She stated in a Facebook event that she has fifteen demo songs and has written a thousand songs/poems. Her next project consisted of covering the song "Scarborough Fair" for the Brazilian telenovela Deus Salve o Rei and filming the opening sequence for it. Between April and August 2018, the singer released two singles, "Queendom" and "Forgotten Love", which would be included in the first half of a two-part album divided into "steps". Aurora recorded the album during her stay in France in January of that year, and the production included the producers Askjell Solstrand, Roy Kerr and Tim Bran, with Aurora herself also involved in this aspect. Some of that new material was anticipated in live performances, including festivals like Lollapalooza and Coachella.

While maintaining some of the themes and stories of the previous album, this production would mark the first time that Aurora has incorporated themes of politics and sexuality into her music. Most of the new inspiration came from the interaction that she had with her fans during her first tour. The music video for "Queendom" saw its release in May 2018, which presented themes of inclusivity and empowerment of "the underdog", particularly her LGBT fans. In the video, Aurora kisses one of her female dancers to convey that "every type of love is accepted and embraced" in her "queendom".

On 28 September 2018, the singer released the first half of her second album on EP format, under the title Infections of a Different Kind (Step 1). The EP features eight songs, and the title itself comes from the eighth track included on it, which Aurora declared as "the most important song I've ever written". A Different Kind of Human (Step 2) followed on 7 June 2019, with lead singles "Animal" and "The River".

On 12 April 2019, Aurora contributed with co-writing and vocals in the songs "Eve of Destruction", "Bango", and "The Universe Sent Me" for the Chemical Brothers' ninth album No Geography. On 4 November 2019, the soundtrack to the Disney film Frozen II was released, with Aurora providing backing vocals on the song "Into the Unknown". On 9 February 2020, she performed the song on stage as part of the 92nd Academy Awards alongside Idina Menzel and nine singers that dubbed the song in their respective languages. She released her solo version of "Into the Unknown" as a standalone single on 3 March 2020.

2020–present: The Gods We Can Touch

Aurora released the single "Exist for Love" in May 2020, which was presented as her first love song ever with a self-directed music video. The song was made during the COVID-19 lockdown in collaboration with Isobel Waller-Bridge, who composed the string arrangements. It was the first glimpse into what she described as "a new era" in her career, with the upcoming release of a new album. Under the musical direction of Gaute Tønder, she recorded the title track of the Christmas miniseries  for Norwegian public broadcaster NRK; such contribution was made known in mid-November of the same year. She also provided her vocals on the songs "Vinterens Gåte" and "Det Ev Ei Rosa Sprunge" (Norwegian version of the German song "Es ist ein Ros entsprungen"), from the album Juleroser by Herborg Kråkevik, in which the Bergen Philharmonic Orchestra and other Norwegian artists. She also re-recorded her track "Running with the Wolves" for the animated fantasy and adventure film Wolfwalkers.

In early 2021, she released five compilation EPs in celebration of her song "Runaway" receiving over 100 million streams on Spotify: For the Humans Who Take Long Walks in the Forest, Music for the Free Spirits, Stories, For the Metal People and Music for the Fellow Witches Out There throughout February. On 7 July 2021, Aurora released the single "Cure for Me" as the lead single for the forthcoming album. On 14 October, "Giving in to the Love" was released as the album's third single, and The Gods We Can Touch was announced for release on 21 January 2022. Aurora featured in Sub Urban's song "Paramour", released on 19 November as a single for the latter's upcoming debut album. She also released the song "Midas Touch for the soundtrack of the third season of the Amazon Prime Video Hanna series. To promote The Gods We Can Touch, she announced a concert tour throughout the United States and Europe (with Sub Urban, Sei Selina and Metteson as supporting acts) in 2022. "Heathens" was released on 3 December 2021 as the album's fourth single, and a virtual concert film was announced, which released exclusively to Moment House on 25 January 2022, a week later after the album's release. A collaborative event with the video game Sky: Children of the Light was released on 17 October 2022, which included a virtual concert that premiered on 8 December after The Game Awards 2022 and reoccurred from 9 December until 2 January 2023.

Artistry

Influences

Aurora's early influences were limited, since at home she didn't have access to radio or music channels on television, and even as she entered her singing career she admitted that she had listened to very few artists. She has mentioned Enya, Bob Dylan, Leonard Cohen, the Beatles, Johnny Cash, Underworld, Oasis, Björk, Kate Bush, and Ane Brun. as her major influences. She said that the first album she bought was Dylan's Blonde on Blonde. She also talked about heavy metal as a major inspiration for her from a young age, citing French band Gojira as her "favorite band" and has attended two of their concerts. She first listened to one of their songs when she was around 11 years old, and described it as "so hard and so intense and dark, and it felt like an explosion." Aurora has also listened to bands Mastodon, System of a Down, Tool, Metallica, Refused and Slayer. She also stated in a BBC Radio 2 interview that she had a great love for many Scandinavian heavy metal bands as well as David Bowie. Her love for heavy metal inspired her compilation EP For the Metal People, which included some of her songs influenced by the genre. Aurora also expressed her admiration for rock musician Iggy Pop, adding that when she met him during a festival in Belgium she was "so happy I almost peed my pants." She and frontman of Nordic folk band Wardruna have shared admiration for each other's work, and performed the song "Helvegen" together several times.

She has covered some of her influences' songs, some of them are "Mr. Tambourine Man", "Famous Blue Raincoat", "Life on Mars", "Across the Universe", and "Make You Feel My Love". About recent influences, Aurora stated that she dislikes listening to music, which she described as "noise" or "interference" for her, adding that she has "music in my mind all the time". She also said that she does not have streaming platforms like iTunes and Spotify but she has "some LPs at home and a few CDs." She added she only likes to listen to some of her influences' music during travelling.

Musical style and themes
On Aurora's profile at Glassnote Records' website, she is quoted as stating:
I don't want to write sad songs only to make people sad, I'll end up with lots of depressed fans. That's not my goal at all. But I want people to know that it's not dangerous to cry or think of something sad for a while. It's easier to think about it through a song, which can also be beautiful while being sad. It's like taking medicine with a teaspoon of sugar. It's important to have some hope.
Aurora has an eclectic musical style, consisting of art pop, Nordic-folk, synth-pop, electropop, electro-folk, dark pop, avant-garde pop, alt-pop, folk-pop, and new-age. Haley Weiss of Interview introduces her as a "poetic author of art-pop" and an "unaffectedly curious artist". John Murphy of MusicOMH describes her songs as a "beguiling mix of sizzling synth-pop, and for want of a better phrase, Nordic-folk". Michael Craag of The Guardian describes her to be "dark electro-pop". Cyclone Wehner from Music Feeds said her music has attracted her a cult fanbase with her "darkly romantic electro-folk" along with her eccentricity. Writing for Paper, Mathias Rosenzweig sees her as "Scandinavia's newest dark pop prodigy" with her love for Nordic folklore, similar to Björk's interest of Icelandic mountains and countrysides. Rosenzweig also mentioned her "unexpected melodic twists" akin to Sia with the "prodigy vibes" of Lorde. Lisa Higgins from Clash, describes her as an artist with an avant-garde pop sound, while Jessica Fynn from the same magazine sees her as an "alt-pop aesthete". Chris Tinkham of Paste says that she has a "dark folk-pop" sound.

Aurora has a soprano vocal range. The word "ethereal" has often been used to qualify her tone of voice, while the repeated use of vocals (like "ah", "oh" and "la") has also been pointed out as something characteristic in her music. Aurora composes her songs in English, given her susceptibility to interpreting highly personal lyrics in her native Norwegian. However, she has sung songs like "Stjernestøv", "Vinterens Gåte" and "Det Hev Ei Rosa Sprunge" in her native language. However, since Infections of a Different Kind (Step 1) she began to include lyrics in an "emotional language" that she invented in favor of changing the energy and meaning of her interpretation. She mostly plays the piano, but also knows how to play other instruments like ukulele, guitar and the harp. She has progressively become involved in percussion and other aspects of the production of her songs.

Personal life

Aurora currently lives in Bergen, but regularly travels to her hometown in Os to visit her parents. She considers herself an introvert. At an early age, she experienced the loss of several loved ones. When a close friend of her family died on Christmas Eve, 11-year-old Aurora had to witness everyone dejected at the funeral service. This experience led her to developing dysphemia, a disorder that prompted her to learn sign language. When a friend from her sign language class died in a car accident, Aurora performed a currently unreleased song titled "Why Did You Go a Place?" during a private concert for her funeral. A friend from Os also died by suicide, and another with whom Aurora had a relationship died in 2011 at the Utøya massacre at the age of 17. Aurora wrote the song "Little Boy in the Grass" as a tribute to the latter and the other victims of the massacre.

Aurora identifies as bisexual. When asked in an interview with The Independent about her sexuality, she stated, "I just like to enjoy what is there, and I like to explore. Just love everything around you and you’re loving yourself." She had cats as pets during her childhood, and in her adulthood she had an algae ball she named "Igor Septimus", which was a gift from her fans in Switzerland. According to her, it was one of her "best friends" and she liked to put it on the refrigerator. Years later, she revealed that it had died. In late 2021, Aurora announced that she had become an aunt when her sister's first child was born. Aurora also talked about collecting dead insects, including moths like one she named "Nightcrawler".

Public image 

In her early years, she drew attention for her childish appearance, pale skin without makeup and short platinum blonde hair the same color as her eyebrows, in contrast to her deep vocal range and the deep meaning of her songs. Aurora then changed her hair style to a partially shaved style referred to as "Norwegian viking", and since 2018 has been characterized by a "two-layered" style (long in front and short in back) reminiscent of anime characters. During the period between Infections of a Different Kind (Step 1) and A Different Kind of Human (Step 2) it became common for her to have lines drawn on her face, which represented "tears and wrinkles of expression."

She identifies as a feminist, and is an advocate of human rights, including racial rights and LGBT rights. She has also expressed a preference for not wearing make-up.  She has also showed support for various environmental awareness movements, topics that she explored in songs like "Apple Tree", "The Seed", and "Soulless Creatures" from her second album. She hailed initiatives made by band Coldplay and activist Greta Thunberg. Her wardrobe is mostly designed from reused garments by Aurora herself and her sister Viktoria. Aurora is a pescatarian, and has expressed her belief that the individual's awareness of food choices is an important part of an environmentally conscious lifestyle.

Philanthropy
Aurora has been involved in several philanthropic causes. In October 2020, she performed her song "Warrior" for volunteers of the Clean Sounds Movement, and called on fellow singers Billie Eilish and Sigrid to do the same. She also participated in several music festivals online, such as Vi er Live (in demonstration against racism and the murder of George Floyd), SOS Rainforest (supporting indigenous communities and jungles of Africa, Asia and South America), and Exist For Love Sessions (to promote various emerging artists). In November 2021, Aurora headlined a non-profit charity event during COP26 to donate funds for Brian Eno's "EarthPercent" charity.

Discography

Selected releases
 All My Demons Greeting Me as a Friend (2016)
 Infections of a Different Kind (Step 1) (EP) (2018)
 A Different Kind of Human (Step 2) (2019)
 The Gods We Can Touch (2022)

Filmography

Feature films

Short films

Television

Tours
Headlining
 Running with the Wolves Tour (2015)
 All My Demons Tour (2016)
 Infections of a Different Kind Tour (2018)
 A Different Kind of Human Tour (2018)
 The Gods We Can Touch Asia Tour (2023)

Co-headlining
 The Gods We Can Touch Tour (with Metteson) (2022)

Awards and nominations

 2014.4.8: A scholarship of 50,000 Kroner from the Festivalen by:Larm's Forbildepriser ("Role Model Award")

Notes

References

External links

 
 

 
Living people
1996 births
21st-century Norwegian women singers
Art pop singers
Bisexual singers
Bisexual songwriters
Bisexual women
English-language singers from Norway
Norwegian bisexual people
Norwegian LGBT singers
Norwegian LGBT songwriters
Norwegian pop singers
Musicians from Stavanger
Musicians from Bergen
Norwegian songwriters
Spellemannprisen winners
Synth-pop singers
Women in electronic music
Glassnote Records artists
20th-century Norwegian LGBT people
21st-century Norwegian LGBT people